Karmatanr may refer to:

 Karmatanr, Dhanbad, a census town in Dhanbad district, Jharkhand, India
 Karmatanr, Jamtara, a census town in Jamtara district, Jharkhand, India
 Karmatanr (community development block), Jamtara district, Jharkhand, India